The Convention on the association of the Netherlands Antilles with the European Economic Community is an international agreement amending the Treaty establishing the European Economic Community, with the aim of awarding OCT status to the Netherlands Antilles, which was a constituent country of the Kingdom of the Netherlands from 1954 until 2010. A full treaty revision was needed because Belgium, France, Germany, Italy, and Luxembourg wanted to add a protocol on the import of refined petroleum products from the Netherlands Antilles.

Background
Because the Charter for the Kingdom of the Netherlands, proclaimed in 1954, instituted a Kingdom in which the three parties—the Netherlands, the Netherlands Antilles, and Suriname—participated on basis of equality, the Netherlands in 1957 only negotiated the Treaties of Rome on behalf of itself. A special protocol attached to both the Treaty establishing the European Economic Community and the Treaty establishing the European Atomic Economic Energy Community specifically declared that the Kingdom was entitled to ratify the treaties for the Netherlands and Netherlands New Guinea only, or for the Kingdom as a whole. Both treaties were indeed subsequently ratified for the Netherlands and Netherlands New Guinea only. A Declaration of Intent on the association of Surinam and the Netherlands Antilles with the European Economic Community, however, was attached to the Final Act of the Intergovernmental Conference for the Common Market and EURATOM:

Suriname became already associated with the European Economic Community on 1 September 1962, by virtue of a Supplementary Act completing the instrument of ratification of the Kingdom of the Netherlands. This was possible, because the protocol attached to the EEC Treaty did not oblige the Kingdom of the Netherlands to only ratify on behalf of the Netherlands and Netherlands New Guinea, but rather established that it was entitled to do so. Applying the treaty to the Netherlands Antilles by Supplementary Act to the instrument of ratification turned out to be an impossibility, as the other five Member States of the Community wanted some safeguards with regard to the import of petroleum products refined in the islands, and thus a full treaty revision according to Article 236 of the EEC Treaty had to be negotiated.

Amendments
The Kingdom of the Netherlands proposed a treaty revision on 4 June 1962. This proposal was met with favourable responses from the Commission, the Assembly, and the Council on 10 September, 19 October, and 22 October, respectively. An Intergovernmental Conference was convened on 13 November, which signed the convention.

The actual Convention consists of four articles, the first of which establishes that the Netherlands Antilles shall be added to the list in Annex IV of the Treaty establishing the European Economic Community (now Annex II). Article 2 adds another protocol to the EEC Treaty, named Protocol concerning imports into the European Economic Community of petroleum products refined in the Netherlands Antilles. Article 3 concerns the ratification and article 4 the authentic versions of the text.

Ratification
The treaty entered into force on 1 October 1964, the first day of the month following the date of deposit of the last instrument of ratification by a signatory state, in this case Italy:

References

External links
The Convention at eur-lex.europa.eu

Treaties concluded in 1962
Treaties entered into force in 1964
1962 in the European Economic Community
1964 in the European Economic Community
Treaties of the Netherlands
Treaties extended to the Netherlands Antilles
Treaties of France
Treaties of Luxembourg
Treaties of Belgium
Treaties of West Germany
Treaties of Italy
Foreign relations of the Netherlands Antilles
Membership treaties of the European Union